The Piano Sonata in E-flat major  568 by Franz Schubert is a sonata for solo piano. It is a revision and completion of the Sonata in D-flat major D. 567. The D-flat major version was composed in June 1817, while the E-flat major revision and completion, published in 1829 after Schubert's death as Op. posth. 122, dates from sometime around 1826.

Movements
I. Allegro moderato

E-flat major

II. Andante molto

G minor

III. Menuetto: Allegretto – Trio

E-flat major

IV. Allegro moderato

E-flat major

This sonata is a transposition and elaboration of the Piano Sonata in D-flat, D. 567.

Daniel Coren summarized the nature of the recapitulation in the first movement of this sonata as "syncopated primary material".

Notes

References
 Tirimo, Martino. Schubert: The Complete Piano Sonatas. Vienna: Wiener Urtext Edition, 1997.

Sources

Further reading

External links

 

Piano sonatas by Franz Schubert
1826 compositions
Compositions in E-flat major